Pseudosermyle is a genus of walkingsticks in the family Diapheromeridae. There are more than 20 described species in Pseudosermyle.

Species
These 26 species belong to the genus Pseudosermyle:

 Pseudosermyle arbuscula (Rehn, 1902)
 Pseudosermyle carinulata (Brunner von Wattenwyl, 1907)
 Pseudosermyle catalinae Rentz & Weissman, 1981 (Catalina walkingstick)
 Pseudosermyle chorreadero Conle, Hennemann & Fontana, 2007
 Pseudosermyle claviger Conle, Hennemann & Fontana, 2007
 Pseudosermyle elongata (Brunner von Wattenwyl, 1907)
 Pseudosermyle godmani (Brunner von Wattenwyl, 1907)
 Pseudosermyle guatemalae (Rehn, 1903)
 Pseudosermyle ignota (Brunner von Wattenwyl, 1907)
 Pseudosermyle incongruens (Brunner von Wattenwyl, 1907)
 Pseudosermyle inconspicua (Brunner von Wattenwyl, 1907)
 Pseudosermyle neptuna (Brunner von Wattenwyl, 1907)
 Pseudosermyle olmeca (Saussure, 1870–1872)
 Pseudosermyle parvula (Carl, 1913)
 Pseudosermyle phalangiphora (Rehn, 1907)
 Pseudosermyle physconia (Rehn, 1904)
 Pseudosermyle praetermissa (Brunner von Wattenwyl, 1907)
 Pseudosermyle procera Conle, Hennemann & Fontana, 2007
 Pseudosermyle straminea (Scudder, 1900)
 Pseudosermyle striatus (Burmeister, 1838)
 Pseudosermyle strigata (Scudder, 1900) (striped walkingstick)
 Pseudosermyle strigiceps (Kaup, 1871)
 Pseudosermyle tenuis Rehn & Hebard, 1909
 Pseudosermyle tolteca (Saussure, 1859)
 Pseudosermyle tridens (Burmeister, 1838)
 Pseudosermyle truncata Caudell, 1903

References

Further reading

 

Phasmatodea
Articles created by Qbugbot